Humphrey Smith is the name of:

Politicians
Humphrey "Yankee" Smith (1774–1857), unofficial founder of the city of Smithville, Missouri and abolitionist
Humphrey Smith (MP) (1542–1589), MP for Bodmin

Others
Humphrey Smith (Quaker) (died 1663), religious writer
Humphrey Smith Racing, NASCAR racing team
Humphrey Smith (businessman), owner of the Samuel Smith Brewery
Humphrey Smith, fictional character in The Sins of St. Anthony